Peter Barthold (born 17 February 1954) is an Austrian retired footballer.

References

External links
 Sturm Archiv 
 

1954 births
Living people
Austrian footballers
Association football goalkeepers
Austrian Football Bundesliga players
SK Rapid Wien players
Wiener Sport-Club players
Austrian football managers
SK Vorwärts Steyr managers
First Vienna FC managers
Wiener Sport-Club managers